The Church of St Michael and All Angels is a church in Forden, Powys, Wales, located about half a mile to the west of the road from Welshpool to Montgomery. For some three hundred years the church was the burial-place of the family of Devereux, whose estate of Nantcribba is within the parish. The marble font, oval in shape, was presented in 1794 by Richard Edmunds, Esq.
It was enlarged in 1830. The church and stained glass was designed by Thomas Nicholson and Edward Burne-Jones.

See also
 List of churches in Powys

References

External links
Artwork at Church of St Michael and All Angels, Forden

Forden, St Michael and All Angels
Churches in Powys